Augustus Greulich was a member of the Wisconsin State Assembly and the Wisconsin State Senate.

Biography
Greulich was born in the Grand Duchy of Baden, Germany in 1813. He moved to the United States in 1834 and settled in Milwaukee, Wisconsin in 1840. Greulich died in 1893.

Career
Greulich was a member of the Milwaukee City Council from 1848 to 1849 and member of the State Assembly in 1848 and 1856. From 1857 to 1858, he was a member of the Senate. He was a Democrat.

References

1813 births
1893 deaths
People from the Grand Duchy of Baden
German emigrants to the United States
Politicians from Milwaukee
Democratic Party Wisconsin state senators
Democratic Party members of the Wisconsin State Assembly
Wisconsin city council members
19th-century American politicians